The 1976 CASAW wildcat strike was a wildcat strike action by members of the Canadian Association of Smelters and Allied Workers Union (CASAW) against Alcan in Kitimat, British Columbia. Lasting 18 days, CASAW members protested against wage and price controls imposed by the federal government.

See also
 2021 Kitimat smelter strike

References

1976 in British Columbia
1976 labor disputes and strikes
Aluminum in Canada
Aluminium smelters
Metallurgical industry of Canada
Kitimat